Zadonsk is a town and the administrative center of Zadonsky District in Lipetsk Oblast, Russia, located on the left bank of the Don River, from which it takes its name,  southwest of Lipetsk, the administrative center of the oblast. Population:

History
It originated in 1615 as a settlement near the walls of the Zadonsky (literally, "over-the-Don") monastery, founded in 1610 by several monks from the Sretensky Monastery in Moscow. The abbey became famous in the 1770s, when a miracle-working starets Tikhon settled there. He died in 1783 and was buried in Zadonsk, which would prosper due to crowds of pilgrims who visited his grave each year. Zadonsk was granted town status in 1779.

Administrative and municipal status
Within the framework of administrative divisions, Zadonsk serves as the administrative center of Zadonsky District. As an administrative division, it is incorporated within Zadonsky District as Zadonsk Town Under District Jurisdiction. As a municipal division, Zadonsk Town Under District Jurisdiction is incorporated within Zadonsky Municipal District as Zadonsk Urban Settlement.

Gallery

References

Notes

Sources

Cities and towns in Lipetsk Oblast
Zadonsky Uyezd